Röstäm Yaxin (or Yäxin - full name in , ; ; 1921 – 1993) was a Tatar composer and pianist. People's Artist of the USSR (1986). Major works: orchestra with piano concerto (1950–1952), ballet Fidai (1987), fortepiano and viola concertos, more than 300 songs and romances. Yaxin is also an author of Hymn of the Republic of Tatarstan. Röstäm Yaxin was a laureate of the Ğabdulla Tuqay Tatar ASSR State Prize in 1959.

Awards 
Order of the Red Banner of Labour
Order of the Badge of Honour
Medal "Veteran of Labour"
Medal "For the Victory over Germany in the Great Patriotic War 1941–1945"
Medal "For the Defence of Moscow"
Jubilee Medal "In Commemoration of the 100th Anniversary since the Birth of Vladimir Il'ich Lenin"
Jubilee Medal "70 Years of the Armed Forces of the USSR"
People's Artist of the USSR
People's Artist of the RSFSR
Honoured Artist of the RSFSR

References and notes 

Russian pianists
Soviet composers
Soviet male composers
Russian composers
Russian male composers
Tatar music
Tatar people
People's Artists of the USSR
1921 births
1993 deaths
20th-century pianists
20th-century classical musicians
20th-century composers
Male pianists
20th-century Russian male musicians